The Uzen Oil Field is an oil field located in Mangystau Province, Kazakhstan. It was discovered in 1961 and developed by KazMunayGas. The oil field is operated and owned by KazMunayGas.

References 

Oil fields of Kazakhstan
Oil fields of the Soviet Union